Romen may refer to:
Romen, Chitral, a suburb in state of Chitral, Pakistan
Romen (river), in Ukraine
Romen, former name for Romny, a city in Ukraine
Romen Theatre, in Moscow
Romen Sova, Soviet and Ukrainian toxicologist